Naḥman ben Samuel ha-Levi was a Frankist rabbi, who lived in Busk, Galicia, in the first part of the eighteenth century. When Mikulski, the administrator of the archbishopric of Lemberg, invited the representatives of Judaism to a disputation with the Frankists on July 16, 1759, Naḥman was one of the Frankist delegates. On his baptism into the Christian faith he took the name of Piotr Jacobski.

References
 

18th-century Jews
Converts to Christianity from Judaism
Frankism
People from Busk, Ukraine
Jews from Galicia (Eastern Europe)